Granhammar Castle (Granhammars Herrgård) is a manor house  at Upplands-Bro Municipality in Uppland, Sweden.

History
The main building was built in 1748-1752 according to drawings by architect Carl Hårleman (1700-1753). 
Between 1802 and 1804, the main building was added with a guest apartment according to drawings by the architect Gustaf Pfeffer  (1768-1844). The surrounding park was expanded and beautified during the years 1777–1819 by under the direction of Jeanna von Lantingshausen (1753–1809)  and Baron Albrekt von Lantingshausen (1751-1820).

See also
List of castles in Sweden

References

Buildings and structures in Stockholm County